The ginkgo-toothed beaked whale (Mesoplodon ginkgodens) is a poorly known species of whale even for a beaked whale, and was named for the unusual shape of its dual teeth. It is a fairly typical-looking species, but is notable for the males not having any scarring.

Description
Ginkgo-toothed beaked whales are more robust than most mesoplodonts, but otherwise look fairly typical. Halfway through the jaw, there is a sharp curve up where the ginkgo leaf-shaped tooth is. Unlike other species such as Blainville's beaked whale and Andrews' beaked whale, the teeth do not arch over the rostrum. The beak itself is of a moderate length. The coloration is overall dark gray on males with light patches on the front half of the beak and around the head, and small white spots on the bottom of the tail, but the location may be variable. Females are a lighter gray and have countershading. Both genders reach  in length.

Population and distribution
This beaked whale has had fewer than 20 strandings off the coasts of Japan, Taiwan, California, the Galapagos Islands, New South Wales, New Zealand, Sri Lanka, the Maldives, and the Strait of Malacca. Its range is essentially tropical and temperate waters in the Indian and Pacific Ocean. There are currently no population estimates.

A potential sighting occurred in the South China Sea in May 2019, although it was possible the sighted whales were Deraniyagala's beaked whales. In February 2021, a pod of three whales was sighted at the Parengarenga Canyons, off North Cape (Otou), New Zealand.

Behavior
Unlike all other known members of Ziphiidae, there is no evidence that the males engage in combat, although this may be due to a limited sample size. The species probably feeds primarily on squid. No other information is known.

Conservation
The only observations of this species while alive have come from hunters off the coasts of Japan and Taiwan, who occasionally take an individual. They are also affected by drift gillnets. One individual, identified from a DNA sample, was known to have interacted with a pelagic longline fishery in the central and western Pacific Ocean. The ginkgo-toothed beaked whale is covered by the Memorandum of Understanding for the Conservation of Cetaceans and Their Habitats in the Pacific Islands Region (Pacific Cetaceans MOU).

Specimens
MNZ MM002618/1, collected Pakawau, Golden Bay, New Zealand, 2004.

See also

List of cetaceans

References

  Database entry includes a brief justification of why this species is of data deficient.
Encyclopedia of Marine Mammals. Edited by William F. Perrin, Bernd Wursig, and J.G.M Thewissen. Academic Press, 2002. 
Sea Mammals of the World. Written by Randall R. Reeves, Brent S. Steward, Phillip J. Clapham, and James A. Owell. A & C Black, London, 2002.

External links
Cetaceans of the World
CMS
Whale & Dolphin Conservation Society (WDCS)

ginkgo-toothed beaked whale
Cetaceans of the Indian Ocean
Cetaceans of the Pacific Ocean
ginkgo-toothed beaked whale